Filipp Sirik (born 3 March 1990 in Moscow) is a Russian professional ice hockey player who currently plays for Arystan Temirtau in the Kazakhstan Hockey Championship league.

References

External links

Russian ice hockey goaltenders
Arystan Temirtau players
Ice hockey people from Moscow
1990 births
Living people